Howard Adams (September 8, 1921 – September 8, 2001) was a twentieth century Metis academic and activist.

Life
He was born in St. Louis, Saskatchewan, Canada, on September 8, 1921, the son of Olive Elizabeth McDougall, a French Métis mother and William Robert Adams, an English Métis (Anglo-Metis) father. 
In his youth he briefly joined the Royal Canadian Mounted Police. Adams became the first Métis in Canada to gain his PhD after studies at the University of California, Berkeley in 1966.

He returned to Canada and became a prominent Métis activist, contributing regularly to newspapers and magazines and appearing on Canadian Broadcasting Corporation radio shows. In 1969, he was elected president of the Metis Association of Saskatchewan.

Adams' intellectual influences include Malcolm X whom he saw lecture at Berkeley, and the general radical environment of that institution during the 1960s. He was the maternal great grandson of Louis Riel's lieutenant Maxime Lepine who fought in the North-West Rebellion of 1885.

Adams died in Vancouver, British Columbia on September 8, 2001, on his 80th birthday.

Works
 The Education of Canadians 1800-1867: The Roots of Separatism, Harvest House, 1968 
 Prison of Grass: Canada from a Native Point of View New Press, 1975, ; Fifth House, 1989, 
 Tortured People: The Politics of Colonization Theytus Books Ltd., 1999,

Honours 
 National Aboriginal Achievement Award, now the Indspire Awards, for education, 1999.

See also
History of Saskatchewan
Politics of Saskatchewan

References

External links
Metis Museum Page on Howard Adams
Aboriginal Faces of Saskatchewan: Howard Adams
 Archives of Howard Adams (Howard Adams fonds, R10982) are held at Library and Archives Canada

Further reading 
 Hartmut Lutz, Murray Hamilton and Donna Heimberker. "Howard Adams: OTAPAWY! The Life of a Metis Leader in his Own Words and in Those of his Contemporaries." Saskatoon: Gabriel Dumont Institute, 2005. 
 Hartmut Lutz: Identity as Interface: Fact and Fiction in the Autobiographical Writings of Howard Adams, in idem, Contemporary achievements. Contextualizing Canadian Aboriginal literatures. Studies in anglophone literatures and cultures, 6. Wißner, Augsburg 2015, pp 222 – 240
 Hartmut Lutz: Not "Neither-Nor" but "Both, and More?" A Transnational Reading of Chicana and Metis Autobiografictions by Sandra Cisneros and Howard Adams, in idem, Contemporary achievements. Contextualizing Canadian Aboriginal literatures. Studies in anglophone literatures and cultures, 6. Wißner, Augsburg 2015, pp 241 – 260

1921 births
2001 deaths
Canadian activists
Canadian Marxists
Writers from Saskatchewan
Métis writers
Canadian Métis people
Indspire Awards
University of California, Berkeley alumni
Canadian expatriates in the United States